Port Andrew is an unincorporated community in the town of Richwood, Richland County, Wisconsin, United States.

Images

References

Unincorporated communities in Richland County, Wisconsin
Unincorporated communities in Wisconsin